Bojan Zajić (born 17 June 1980) is a Serbian former professional footballer and coach who is assistant manager of Sandnes Ulf.

Club career
Born in Kruševac, Zajić came through the youth system at his hometown club Napredak, making his senior debut in 1998. He was transferred to Obilić in the summer of 2001. While with the Vitezovi, Zajić made 110 league appearances and scored 10 goals, before leaving due to the club's financial problems in the 2006 winter transfer window. He subsequently joined BASK, playing in the second tier until the end of the 2005–06 season.

On 7 July 2006, Zajić signed a four-year contract with Partizan. He scored a brace in a 4–2 home victory over Groningen in the first leg of the UEFA Cup first round on 14 September 2006. In total, Zajić made 33 appearances and scored six goals across all competitions during the 2006–07 season.

In August 2007, Zajić moved to Norwegian club Vålerenga, on an initial three-month loan. He made seven league appearances and scored once until the end of the season, before signing a permanent contract with the club. In the following years, Zajić became one of the team's most important players, making 170 competitive appearances and scoring 37 goals.

On 6 January 2014, Zajić signed a two-year contract with Sarpsborg 08. He was the club's top scorer in the following two seasons (2014 and 2015). On 18 January 2016, Zajić signed a two-year contract with Sandnes Ulf. He eventually retired from professional football in June 2017, becoming the team's assistant manager.

International career
Zajić played one match for the national team of Serbia and Montenegro at the 2004 Kirin Cup against Slovakia. He also made one appearance for the Serbia national team in a friendly match against Poland in December 2008.

Statistics

Club
Sources:

International

Honours
Vålerenga
 Norwegian Cup: 2008

References

External links

 
 
 
 

Association football midfielders
Eliteserien players
Expatriate footballers in Norway
First League of Serbia and Montenegro players
FK BASK players
FK Napredak Kruševac players
FK Obilić players
FK Partizan players
Norwegian First Division players
Sandnes Ulf players
Sarpsborg 08 FF players
Second League of Serbia and Montenegro players
Serbia and Montenegro footballers
Serbia and Montenegro international footballers
Serbia international footballers
Serbian expatriate footballers
Serbian expatriate sportspeople in Norway
Serbian footballers
Serbian SuperLiga players
Sportspeople from Kruševac
Vålerenga Fotball players
1980 births
Living people